Ashley Bashioum is an American actress.

Career
She starred on The Young and the Restless as Mackenzie Browning from 1999 to 2002 and from 2004 to 2005. In 2007, she was in the "B" movie Flight of the Living Dead: Outbreak on a Plane. In 2003, she did an episode of The Shield.

Filmography

References

External links

Living people
American television actresses
21st-century American actresses
Actresses from Chicago
American film actresses
Year of birth missing (living people)